Mieczysław Jan Ireneusz Lubelski (31 December 1886 – 29 April 1965) was a Polish monumental sculptor and ceramist, of Jewish descent.

In 1906–07 he entered the Academy of Fine Arts in Warsaw, where he was a pupil of Xawery Dunikowski, and later studied in Berlin. After 1929 he returned to Warsaw. He was very active in the inter-war years and had many exhibitions, including at Warsaw's Zachęta Gallery in 1920. During the German occupation of Poland he joined the Armia Krajowa – Home Army resistance - and took part in the Warsaw Uprising, following which he was incarcerated in a Nazi German concentration camp. After the war he settled and worked in England.
 
He created many sculptures for public buildings and churches, perhaps his best known being the Polish War Memorial at Northolt Aerodrome, west London, unveiled in 1948. One of his funerary monuments in Britain is a Christ praying in Gethsemane, a ceramic in a concrete chapel on the grave of Dr. Antoni Kutek at Brompton Cemetery, London.

His works in Warsaw included: 
Stone knights' armorials and lions decorating the Ministry of Army Affairs (Defence) near Nowowiejska St.
Bas-reliefs in the buildings of the National Theatre
Ministry of Justice
PKO Bank near Sienkiewicza St. (all 1924)
Bas-relief over the portal of the State Institute of Hygiene
Decorative folk sculptures at the Raczyński Palace (both 1925)
Military Sappers' Monument (1932) 
Almost all of his works were destroyed during the Second World War. 
His well-loved Kosciuszko Monument in Liberty Square, central Łódź (1930), which the Germans destroyed in 1939, was re-created by the artist in 1960. The monument Lubelski designed for the grave of L.L. Zamenhof, the creator of Esperanto, still stands in the Jewish Cemetery, Warsaw. 

Lubelski, as sculptor appears as a very minor character in the novel A Curable Romantic (2010) by Joseph Skibell.

Lubelski is buried in Brookwood Cemetery, Brookwood, Surrey, England.

Gallery

References

 Based on: Polish Artists' Dictionary PSB, t. V. Warsaw 1993.

External links
 warszawa1939.pl  
 "Sześćdziesiąt lat temu odbudowano pomnik gen. Kościuszki na placu Wolności" – the reconstruction of the Kosciuszko Monument in Lodz

1886 births
1965 deaths
20th-century ceramists
People from Warsaw
Polish sculptors
Polish male sculptors
Polish emigrants to the United Kingdom
Warsaw Uprising insurgents
Nazi concentration camp survivors
20th-century sculptors
20th-century Polish sculptors
Polish male sculptors
20th-century male artists
Burials at Brookwood Cemetery